Giannis Vidalis (born 1 June 1997) is a Greek professional footballer who plays as a right back for Kallithea.

Career
Vidalis made his debut with AEK Athens against Pannaxiakos on the last matchday of 2013–14 season assisting fellow U-17 teammate Andreas Vlachomitros score the final 3–1 score.

Honours
AEK Athens
Football League 2: 2013–14 (6th Group)

External links
 http://www.aekfc.gr/d/k20-43657.htm?lang=el&path=-693370973
 

1997 births
Living people
AEK Athens F.C. players
Association football fullbacks
Footballers from Athens
Greek footballers